Antonio Narciso de Santa María (Alcántara, Spain; 1716 – 1777)  was a Spanish colonel and Governor of Chiloé in the mid-18th century. Given the threat of war with Britain at the time Governor Antonio Narciso de Santa María highlighted for the Spanish authorities the key position of Chiloé Island to control the Patagonian Archipelagos and recommended to focus on the defences in Chiloé. He retired from the army in 1774 and lived in Concepción. He died in 1777.  It was following Narciso de Santa María's recommendations that the Spanish  founded the "city-fort" of Ancud in 1767–1768.

References

1716 births
1777 deaths
Royal Governors of Chiloé